Radwanków Szlachecki is a village in Otwock County, Gmina Sobienie-Jeziory.The  population is near 150. In the village is Voivodship Road 801. It lies near the Vistula river. From 1975 to 1998 village was in Siedlce Voivodeship.

Villages nearby

Warszawice, Dziecinów, Sobienie-Jeziory, Sobienie Biskupie.

Villages in Otwock County